Lithophyllum is a genus of thalloid red algae belonging to the family Corallinaceae.

Fossil record
This genus is known in the fossil record from the Silurian to the Quaternary (from about 418.7 to 0.0 million years ago). Fossils of species within this genus have been found in Europe, United States, South America, Egypt, Iran, Iraq, India, Japan and Australia.

Description
The monomerous, crustose thalli are composed of a single system of filaments which grow close to the underlying surface. Lithophyllum reproduces by means of conceptacles.  The epithallus is periodically shed to avoid organisms growing on top of the alga.

Species
The valid species currently considered to belong to this genus are:

Lithophyllum acanthinum   Foslie, 1907
Lithophyllum accedens   Foslie, 1907
Lithophyllum acrocamptum   Heydrich, 1902
Lithophyllum aequum   Foslie, 1907
Lithophyllum albanense   Lemoine, 1924
Lithophyllum almanense   Lemoine, 1920
Lithophyllum alternans   M. Lemoine, 1929
Lithophyllum amplostratum   W.R. Taylor, 1945
Lithophyllum aninae   Foslie, 1907
Lithophyllum antillarum   Foslie & Howe, 1906
Lithophyllum atalayense   Lemoine, 1920
Lithophyllum azorum   M. Lemoine
Lithophyllum bahrijense   Bosence, 1983
Lithophyllum balmeri   (Heydrich) Heydrich
Lithophyllum bamleri   (Heydrich) Heydrich, 1897
Lithophyllum belgicum   Foslie, 1909
Lithophyllum bipartitum   M. Lemoine
Lithophyllum brachiatum  (Heydrich) M. Lemoine, 1929
Lithophyllum byssoides   (Lamarck) Foslie, 1900
Lithophyllum californiense   Heydrich, 1901
Lithophyllum canescens   (Foslie) Foslie, 1905
Lithophyllum carpophylli (Heydrich) Heydrich, 1897 
Lithophyllum chamberlainianum   Woelkerling & S.J. Campbell, 1992
Lithophyllum complexum   M. Lemoine, 1929
Lithophyllum congestum   (Foslie) Foslie, 1900
Lithophyllum corallinae   (P.L. Crouan & H.M. Crouan) Heydrich, 1897
Lithophyllum crodelioides   Boudouresque
Lithophyllum cuneatum   Keats, 1995
Lithophyllum cystoseirae   (Hauck) Heydrich, 1897
Lithophyllum decussatum   (J. Ellis & Solander) Philippi, 1837
Lithophyllum dentatum   (Kützing), Foslie 1900
Lithophyllum detrusum   Foslie, 1906
Lithophyllum dispar   (Foslie) Foslie, 1909
Lithophyllum divaricatum   M. Lemoine, 1929
Lithophyllum dublancqui   Lemoine, 1918
Lithophyllum duckerae   Woelkerling, 1983
Lithophyllum elegans   (Foslie) Foslie, 1900
Lithophyllum esperi   (M. Lemoine) South & Tittley
Lithophyllum falkandicum  (Foslie) Foslie, 1906
Lithophyllum fasciculatum   (Lamarck) Foslie, 1900
Lithophyllum fernandezianum   Lemoine, 1920
Lithophyllum fetum   Foslie, 1907
Lithophyllum flavescens  Keats, 1997
Lithophyllum giraudii   Lemoine, 1918
Lithophyllum gracile   Foslie
Lithophyllum grumosum   (Foslie) Foslie, 1898
Lithophyllum hancockii   E.Y. Dawson, 1944
Lithophyllum hermaphroditum   (Heydrich) W.J. Woelkerling, 1991
Lithophyllum hibernicum   Foslie, 1906
Lithophyllum imitans   Foslie, 1909
Lithophyllum impressum   Foslie, 1905
Lithophyllum incrustans   Philippi, 1837
Lithophyllum insipidum   Adey, Townsend & Boykins, 1982
Lithophyllum intermedium   Foslie, 1906
Lithophyllum irregulare   (Foslie) Huvé ex Steentoft
Lithophyllum irvineanum   Woelkerling & S.J. Campbell, 1992
Lithophyllum johansenii   Woelkerling & Campbell, 1992
Lithophyllum kotschyanum  Unger, 1858
Lithophyllum lapidea   Foslie, 1906
Lithophyllum leptothalloideum   Pilger
Lithophyllum lithophylloides  Heydrich, 1901
Lithophyllum lividum   Lemoine, 1930
Lithophyllum margaritae   (Hariot) Heydrich, 1901
Lithophyllum mgarrense   Bosence, 1983
Lithophyllum mutabile   M. Lemonie, 1929
Lithophyllum neoatalayense   Masaki, 1968
Lithophyllum nitorum   W.H. Adey & P.J. Adey, 1973
Lithophyllum okamurae   Foslie, 1900
Lithophyllum orbiculatum   (Foslie) Foslie, 1900
Lithophyllum pallescens   (Foslie) Foslie, 1900
Lithophyllum papillosum   Zanardini ex Hauck, 1885
Lithophyllum paradoxum   Foslie, 1908
Lithophyllum pinguiense   Heydrich, 1901
Lithophyllum polycarpum   Zanardini
Lithophyllum polycephalum   Foslie
Lithophyllum polyclonum   Foslie, 1905
Lithophyllum prelichenoides  M. Lemoine, 1939
Lithophyllum premoluccense   Lemoine, 1918
Lithophyllum preprototypum   Me. Lemoine, 1917
Lithophyllum proboscideum   (Foslie) Foslie, 1900
Lithophyllum prototypum   (Foslie) Foslie, 1905
Lithophyllum punctatum   Foslie, 1906
Lithophyllum pustulatum  (J.V. Lamouroux) Foslie, 1904
Lithophyllum pygmaeum   (Heydrich) Heydrich, 1897
Lithophyllum racemus   (Lamarck) Foslie, 1901
Lithophyllum reesei   E.Y. Dawson, 1960
Lithophyllum retusum   (Foslie) Foslie
Lithophyllum rileyi   M. Lemoine, 1929
Lithophyllum rugosum   (Foslie) Lemoine, 1913
Lithophyllum sancti-georgei   M. Lemoine, 1929
Lithophyllum shioense   Foslie, 1906
Lithophyllum sierra-blancae   Howe, 1934
Lithophyllum simile   Foslie, 1909
Lithophyllum skottsbergii   Lemoine, 1920
Lithophyllum stephensonii   (M. Lemoine) 
Lithophyllum stictaeforme  (J.E. Areschoug) Hauck, 1878
Lithophyllum subantarcticum   (Foslie) Foslie, 1907
Lithophyllum subreduncum   Foslie
Lithophyllum subtenellum   (Foslie) Foslie, 1909
Lithophyllum tarentinum   Mastrorilli
Lithophyllum tedeschii   P. Fravega, M. Piazza & G. Vannucci, 1993
Lithophyllum tortuosum   (Esper) Foslie, 1900
Lithophyllum trinidadense   Lemoine, 1917
Lithophyllum tuberculatum  Foslie, 1906
Lithophyllum tumidulum' '  Foslie, 1901Lithophyllum uvaria   M. Lemoine, 1924Lithophyllum veleroae   E.Y. Dawson, 1944Lithophyllum yessoense   Foslie, 1909

Bibliography
 Philippi, R.A. (1837). Beweis, dass die Nulliporen Pflanzen sind. Archiv für Naturgeschichte 3: 387-393, figs 2-6, pl. IX.
 Foslie, M. (1900). Revised systematical survey of the Melobesieae. Kongelige Norske Videnskabers Selskabs Skrifter 1900(5): 1-22.
 Woelkerling, W.J. (1998). Lamarck's nullipores. In: Non-geniculate Coralline Red Algae and the Paris Muséum: Systematics and Scientific History. (Woelkerling, W.J. & Lamy, D. Eds), pp. 101–404. Paris: Publications Scientifiques du Muséum/A.D.A.C.

References

External links

Images of Lithophyllum'' at Algaebase
Genus Lithophyllum at The Taxonomicon

Corallinaceae
Red algae genera